Rúben Flávio Santos das Neves (born 12 May 1991) is a Portuguese footballer who plays for C.D.C. Montalegre as a midfielder.

Club career
Born in São João da Madeira, Neves came through the ranks of hometown club A.D. Sanjoanense and made his senior debut with the team in the fourth division in 2009–10, in which his team was relegated. In 2012, he moved to C.D. Cinfães, helping them to second place in the third tier in his only season.

Afterwards, Neves enjoyed two campaigns as a professional with C.D. Aves in the Segunda Liga. He played his first match in the competition on 11 August 2013 in a 0–2 home loss against C.F. União where he featured the 90 minutes, and scored his first goal the following weekend, helping the visitors to a 1–1 draw at U.D. Oliveirense.

Neves dropped back to division three in the summer of 2015, by returning to Sanjoanense. He spent the rest of his career at that level, with S.C. Salgueiros, S.C. Freamunde, Cinfães again, F.C. Felgueiras 1932 and C.D.C. Montalegre.

References

External links

1991 births
Living people
People from São João da Madeira
Portuguese footballers
Association football midfielders
Liga Portugal 2 players
Segunda Divisão players
A.D. Sanjoanense players
C.D. Cinfães players
C.D. Aves players
S.C. Salgueiros players
S.C. Freamunde players
F.C. Felgueiras 1932 players
C.D.C. Montalegre players
Sportspeople from Aveiro District